Fornari is a surname.  Notable people with the surname include:

Fabio Fornari (died 1596), Roman Catholic prelate who served as Bishop of Nardò
Franco Fornari (1921–1985), Italian psychiatrist
Girolamo Fornari (died 1542), Roman Catholic prelate who served as Bishop of Belcastro
Maria Vittoria De Fornari Strata (1562–1617), Italian Roman Catholic professed religious and the foundress of the Order of the Annunciation - or Blue Nuns
Maximiliano Fornari (born 1995), Argentine footballer

See also 
Erick Fornaris (born 1979), Cuban divers
Fornaro (disambiguation)

References